Semyonovka is a rural locality in Lebyazhensky Selsoviet Rural Settlement, Kursky District, Kursk Oblast, Russia. Population:

Geography 
The village is located on the Mlodat River (a left tributary of the Seym), 83 km from the Russia–Ukraine border, 15 km south-east of Kursk, 4 km from the selsoviet center – Cheryomushki.

 Climate
Semyonovka has a warm-summer humid continental climate (Dfb in the Köppen climate classification).

Transport 
Semyonovka is located 2.5 km from the road of intermunicipal significance  (Kursk – Petrin), 12 km from the nearest railway halt 465 km (railway line Lgov I — Kursk).

The rural locality is situated 21.5 km from Kursk Vostochny Airport, 103 km from Belgorod International Airport and 207 km from Voronezh Peter the Great Airport.

References

Notes

Sources

Rural localities in Kursky District, Kursk Oblast